Salisbury steak is a dish originating in the United States and made from a blend of ground beef and other ingredients and usually served with gravy or brown sauce. It is a version of Hamburg steak.

Background 

Hamburg was a common embarkation point for transatlantic voyages during the first half of the 19th century and New York City was the most common destination. Various New York restaurants offered Hamburg-style American fillet, or even beefsteak à Hambourgeoise. Early American preparations of ground beef were therefore made to fit the tastes of European immigrants.

Origin of the name
James H. Salisbury (1823–1905) was an American physician and chemist known for his advocacy of a meat-centered diet to promote health, and the term Salisbury steak for a ground beef patty served as the main course has been used in the United States since 1897. Today, Salisbury steak is usually served with a gravy similar in texture to brown sauce, along with various side dishes. It is a common item in supermarket frozen food sections.

Dr. Salisbury recommended this recipe (somewhat different from modern Salisbury steak recipes) for the treatment of alimentation (digestive problems):

U.S. standards of identity (for packaged product) 
United States Department of Agriculture standards for processed, packaged "Salisbury steak" require a minimum content of 65% meat, of which up to 25% can be pork, except if de-fatted beef or pork is used, the limit is 12% combined. No more than 30% may be fat. Meat byproducts are not permitted; however, beef heart meat is allowed. Extender (bread crumbs, flour, oat flakes, etc.) content is limited to 12%, except isolated soy protein at 6.8% is considered equivalent to 12% of the others. The remainder consists of seasonings, fungi or vegetables (onion, bell pepper, mushroom or the like), binders (can include egg) and liquids (such as water, milk, cream, skim milk, buttermilk, brine, vinegar etc.). The product must be fully cooked, or else labeled "Patties for Salisbury Steak".

See also 

 List of steak dishes
 Meatloaf
 Pljeskavica
 Rissole
 Swiss steak
 Tteok-galbi

References

External links 
 

Hamburgers (food)
American meat dishes
British cuisine